Tritoniopsis is a genus of sea slugs, specifically dendronotid nudibranchs. It is a marine gastropod mollusc in the family Tritoniidae.

Species 
Species in the genus Tritoniopsis include:
 Tritoniopsis brucei Eliot, 1905 - type species of the Genus
 Tritoniopsis cincta (Pruvot-Fol, 1937)
 Tritoniopsis elegans (Audouin in Savigny, 1826)
 Tritoniopsis frydis Er. Marcus & Ev. Marcus, 1970
Species brought into synonymy
 Tritoniopsis alba (Baba, 1949): synonym of Tritoniopsis elegans (Audouin, 1826)
 Tritoniopsis gravieri Vayssière, 1912: synonym of Tritoniopsis elegans (Audouin, 1826)

References

Tritoniidae